This is the complete discography of Italian pop duo Paola e Chiara including albums, singles, videos and DVDs.

Albums

Studio albums

EPs
2005: Fatalità
2005: A modo mio
2007: Second Life
2009: Emozioni
2010: Pioggia d'estate
2013: Divertiamoci (perché c'è feeling)
2023: Furore Pack

Compilations

Singles

DVDs

Music videos

References

Paola e Chiara
Pop music group discographies